Arthur Frank Holmes (March 15, 1924 – October 8, 2011) was an English philosopher who served as Professor of Philosophy at Wheaton College in Illinois, US from 1951 to 1994. He built the philosophy department at Wheaton where he taught, wrote about the philosophy of Christian education, and participated in the creation of the Society of Christian Philosophers. Wheaton College President Philip Ryken said "It would be hard to think of anyone who has had a greater impact on Christian higher education than Arthur Holmes." Holmes died in Wheaton, Illinois, on October 8, 2011, at age 87.

Education and career at Wheaton College 
A native of Dover, England, Holmes came to the United States in 1947 after serving in the Royal Air Force during World War II. He earned a bachelor's degree (1950) and a master's degree (1952) in Bible and theology from Wheaton College and a Ph.D. in philosophy from Northwestern University in Chicago (1957).

Holmes began teaching at his alma mater while still pursuing his graduate degrees and remained there for his entire 43-year career. He was involved in convincing the college to establish a philosophy department independent of the Bible and theology division, and he served as the chair of that department for more than two decades. He started the annual Wheaton Philosophy Conference in 1954, which eventually led to the creation of the Society of Christian Philosophers in 1978. He taught the year-long history of philosophy course for the philosophy major (made available online in 2015). Holmes retired in 1994 and was named Professor Emeritus; he continued to teach occasionally.

Honors and awards 
 Wheaton College Teacher of the Year, 1966
 Wheaton College Alumnus of the Year for Distinguished Service to Alma Mater, 1978
 Wheaton College Teacher of the Year, 1983
 Illinois Professor of the Year, 1987 (Council for Advancement and Support of Education)
 Professor of the Year with highest honors, 1994 (All-Professor Team, The Chicago Tribune)
 Mark O. Hatfield Leadership Award, 1998 (Coalition for Christian Colleges and Universities)
In 1998, the Arthur F. Holmes Chair of Faith and Learning was established at Wheaton College, supporting  the work of scholars in philosophy, history, or English who gave particular attention to the integration of faith and learning, which had been of particular interest to Holmes.

Holmes also served as a guest lecturer at many colleges, universities, and conferences. He received two honorary doctoral degrees.

Notable students
Holmes' had the "grand vision" for the Wheaton College philosophy department that it would produce 100 graduates who would go on to earn Ph.D.s in philosophy. Several years after Holmes' death, former student Clifford Williams investigated whether that ambition had been achieved; he identified at least 116 of Holmes' former students who had earned doctorates in philosophy. Many of Holmes' former students also pursued advanced study in other fields, such as history, literature, and Biblical studies. Among his notable students are:
William Lane Craig, Biola University
C. Stephen Evans, Baylor University
Jorge J. E. Gracia, SUNY Buffalo
Douglas Jacobsen, Messiah University
Mark A. Noll, University of Notre Dame
Philip Graham Ryken, eighth and current president of Wheaton College
Jon M. Sweeney, author and publisher 
Marianne Meye Thompson, Fuller Seminary 
Clifford Williams, Wheaton College

Published writings
Holmes wrote or edited 14 books and many articles on topics related to philosophy, including ethics, philosophy applied to Christian higher education, and historical interactions between Christianity and philosophy. His publications include:
Christianity and Philosophy (Inter-Varsity Press, 1963) ; republished as Philosophy: A Christian Perspective (Inter-Varsity Press, 1978) 
Christian Philosophy in the Twentieth Century: An Essay in Philosophical Methodology (Craig Press, 1969) 
Faith Seeks Understanding: A Christian Approach to Knowledge (Eerdmans, 1971) 
The Idea of a Christian College (Eerdmans, first edition 1975; revised edition 1987) ; 
All Truth is God's Truth (Eerdmans, 1977) 
Contours of a World View (Eerdmans, 1983) 
Ethics: Approaching Moral Decisions (InterVarsity Press, first edition 1989; second edition 2007) ; 
Shaping Character: Moral Education in the Christian College (Eerdmans, 1990) 
Fact, Value, and God (Eerdmans, 1997) 
Building the Christian Academy (Eerdmans, 2001) 
As Editor:
 War and Christian Ethics: Classic and Contemporary Readings on the Morality of War (Baker, first edition 1975; second edition 2005) ; 
The Making of a Christian Mind : A Christian World View & the Academic Enterprise (InterVarsity, 1985)

Reference list

See also 
 American philosophy
 List of American philosophers

External links 
 Arthur Holmes' History of Philosophy Lectures (YouTube)

1924 births
2011 deaths
Philosophers from Illinois
American philosophy academics
Wheaton College (Illinois) alumni
Wheaton College (Illinois) faculty
20th-century American philosophers
Protestant philosophers
British emigrants to the United States